Hlaponci is a settlement in the Municipality of Juršinci in northeastern Slovenia. It lies in the valley of a minor left tributary of the Pesnica River in the Slovene Hills. The area is part of the traditional region of Styria. It is now included with the rest of the municipality in the Drava Statistical Region.

A small chapel-shrine with a belfry in the southwestern part of the settlement was built in the second half of the 19th century.

References

External links
Hlaponci on Geopedia

Populated places in the Municipality of Juršinci